Rikizo Takata (18 October 1900 – 31 October 1992) was a Japanese painter. His work was part of the painting event in the art competition at the 1936 Summer Olympics.

References

1900 births
1992 deaths
20th-century Japanese painters
Japanese painters
Olympic competitors in art competitions
People from Kurume